Meet the Chump is a 1941 American film starring Hugh Herbert.

Plot
A man desperately attempts to avoid giving up the ten million dollar trust that he's been administering so well that there's barely any money left.

Cast

 Hugh Herbert as Hugh Mansfield
 Lewis Howard as John Francis Mansfield III
 Jean Brooks as Madge Reilly
 Anne Nagel as Miss Burke
 Kathryn Adams as Gloria Mitchell
 Shemp Howard as Stinky Fink
 Richard Lane as Slugs Bennett
 Andrew Tombes as Revello
 Hobart Cavanaugh as Juniper
 Charles Halton as Dr. Stephanowsky
 Martin Spellman as Champ
 Edward Gargan as Muldoon

References

External links

1941 films
American comedy films
1941 comedy films
American black-and-white films
Universal Pictures films
Films directed by Edward F. Cline
1940s English-language films
1940s American films